USS LST-41 was a United States Navy  used exclusively in the Asiatic-Pacific Theater during World War II. Like many of her class, she was not named and is properly referred to by her hull designation.

Construction 
LST-41 was laid down on 24 May 1943, at Pittsburgh, Pennsylvania by the Dravo Corporation; launched on 17 August 1943; sponsored by Mrs Mary Spisak; and commissioned on 24 September 1943.

Service history  
During World War II, LST-41 was assigned to the Asiatic-Pacific theater.

Following the war, LST-41 was redesignated LST(H)-41 on 15 September 1945. She performed occupation duty in the Far East until late November 1945.

Upon her return to the United States, the ship was decommissioned on 25 April 1946, and struck from the Navy list on 19 June 1946. On 8 October 1947, she was sold to J. C. Berkwit & Co., of New York City, N.Y.

Awards
LST-41 earned five battle stars for World War II service.

References

Bibliography 

 
 

 

World War II amphibious warfare vessels of the United States
Ships built in Pittsburgh
1943 ships
LST-1-class tank landing ships of the United States Navy
Ships built by Dravo Corporation